Rebecca J. Cole (March 16, 1846August 14, 1922) was an American physician, organization founder and social reformer. In 1867, she became the second African-American woman to become a doctor in the United States, after Rebecca Lee Crumpler three years earlier. Throughout her life she faced racial and gender-based barriers to her medical education, training in all-female institutions which were run by the first generation of graduating female physicians.

Early life and education
Cole was born in Philadelphia on March 16, 1846, one of five children. 

Cole attended high school at the Institute for Colored Youth where the curriculum that included Latin, Greek, and mathematics, graduating in 1863. She went on to graduate from the Woman's Medical College of Pennsylvania in 1867, under the supervision of Ann Preston, the first woman to be dean of the school. The Women’s Medical College was founded by Quaker abolitionists and temperance reformers in 1850. Initially named the Female Medical College of Pennsylvania, it was the first school to offer formal medical training to women with the culmination of an M.D. Cole's graduate thesis was titled The Eye and Its Appendages. In her senior year, Cole lived with fellow medical students Odelia Blinn and Martha E. Hutchings. Nearly thirty years later Blinn wrote an article detailing how crossing the 'color line'  in Philadelphia nearly derailed Cole's studies at the college and her plans for a medical career.

Career
Following her graduation, Cole interned at Elizabeth Blackwell's New York Infirmary for Indigent Women and Children where she was assigned the task of going into tenements to teach prenatal care and hygiene to women. Cole went on to briefly practice medicine in South Carolina before returning to Philadelphia. In 1873 Cole opened a Women's Directory Center with Dr. Charlotte Abbey which provided medical and legal services to disadvantaged women and children. In January 1899, Cole was appointed superintendent of a home run by the Association for the Relief of Destitute Colored Women and Children in Washington, D.C. The association's 1899 annual report stated that Cole possessed "all the qualities essential to such a position-ability, energy, experience, tact." A subsequent report noted that:

Cole practiced medicine for fifty years. In 2015, she was chosen as an Innovators Walk of Fame honoree by the University City Science Center, Philadelphia.

Death 
Cole died on August 14, 1922 at the age of 76. She is buried at Eden Cemetery in Collingdale, Pennsylvania. Few records or photos of her have survived.

References

External links 
 

1846 births
1922 deaths
Physicians from Philadelphia
Woman's Medical College of Pennsylvania alumni
Cheyney University of Pennsylvania alumni
African-American physicians
American primary care physicians
19th-century American women physicians
19th-century American physicians
Burials at Eden Cemetery (Collingdale, Pennsylvania)
20th-century African-American people
20th-century African-American women